Laila Stien (born 16 May 1946 in Hemnes, Helgeland) is a Norwegian novelist, poet, author of children's literature and translator from Hemnes. She grew up in Rana and later lived in Finnmark.

Stien made her literary debut in 1979 with the short stories collection Nyveien. Before her first book, she was represented with texts in the anthologies Nordfra (1975) and Nordnorge foreteller (1977). Her literary works are often embedded with elements from Northern Norway and Sami culture. She received the Norwegian Critics Prize for Best children's book in 1993, and the Aschehoug Prize in 2000.

Stien has translated books from Sami language into Norwegian and has edited anthologies on modern Sami literature.

Her son, Ailo Gaup, is world champion in Freestyle Motocross.

Selected works
Nyveien (short stories; 1979)
Fabler. Frost (poetry; 1981)
Fuglan veit (short stories; 1984)
Sånt som skjer (short stories; 1988)
Hold stø båt (poetry, texts; 1990)
I det fri (short stories; 1994)
Vekselsang (novel; 1997)
Gjennom glass (short stories; 1999)
Svømmetak (short stories; 2001)
Veranda med sol (short stories; 2003)

Children's books
I farta (1986)
Ole P og den merkverdige sola (1990)
Å plukke en smørblomst (1993)
Klar, ferdig, kjør! (1998)
Ei jente på scooteren (1999)

Awards
Rana municipality Cultural Prize 1986
Språklig samling's Literary Prize 1992
Norwegian Critics Prize for the year's best children's or youth's literature 1993, for Å plukke en smørblomst
Havmann Prize 1999, for Gjennom glass
Aschehoug Prize 2000
Alta municipality Cultural Prize 2002

References

1946 births
Living people
People from Hemnes
People from Rana, Norway
20th-century Norwegian novelists
21st-century Norwegian novelists
20th-century Norwegian poets
Norwegian women short story writers
Norwegian children's writers
Norwegian translators
Norwegian Critics Prize for Literature winners
Norwegian women novelists
Norwegian women children's writers
Norwegian women poets
21st-century Norwegian women writers
20th-century Norwegian women writers
20th-century Norwegian short story writers
21st-century Norwegian short story writers